NFDC may refer to:

 National Flight Data Center, a branch of the FAA that produces a complete navigation database for the United States of America.
 National Federation of Demolition Contractors, a UK trade association.
 National Film Development Corporation (disambiguation), various meanings:
 National Film Development Corporation of India
 National Film Development Corporation Malaysia

 New Freedom Data Center